Figure skating is a part of the Winter Universiade. It was first held as part of the Universiade in 1960. Medals may be awarded in men's singles, ladies' singles, pair skating, ice dancing, and synchronized skating.

Results

Men

Women

Pairs

Ice dance

Synchronized skating

Medal table
Last updated after the 2023 Winter World University Games

References

External links
 Skate Canada results book

 
Sports at the Winter Universiade
Universiade